The Journal of Creative Communications is published three times a year by SAGE Publications (New Delhi, India) in collaboration with MICA, Shela, Ahmedabad, India. It is an international double-blind peer-reviewed journal.

JOCC is a journal in the field of communication theory and practice. It describes itself as a journal that 'promotes inquiry into contemporary communication issues within wider social, economic, cultural, technological and management contexts, and provides a forum for the discussion of theoretical and practical insights emerging from such inquiry.' 

This journal is a member of the Committee on Publication Ethics (COPE). JOCC is currently edited by Dr Manisha Pathak-Shelat, MICA.

Abstracting and indexing
The Journal of Creative Communications is abstracted and indexed in:

 Emerging Sources Citation Index
 DeepDyve
 Dutch-KB
 Portico
 EBSCO
 Indian Citation Index
 J-Gate
 OCLC
 Ohio
 SCOPUS
 J-Gate
 University Grants Commission (India)

News

Research and case studies published by JOCC have appeared across multiple new sites. The paper 'Materiality and Discursivity of Cyber Violence Against Women in India'  by Sahana Sarkar and Benson Rajan was cited in various articles., outlining the online abuse faced by women in India. The paper titled 'The Twitter Revolution in the Gulf Countries' by Badreya Al-Jenaibi was cited by an article in The Washington Post.

Editor

 Dr Manisha Pathak Shelat - MICA (institute)

Associate Editors

 Kallol Das – MICA (institute)
 Kjerstin Thorson – Michigan State University
 Rajat Roy – Bond University

References

External links
 
 Homepage
 Journal Webpage
 Materiality and Discursivity of Cyber Violence Against Women in India
 Opinion | Online abuse against women
 Online abuse against women is rife, but some women suffer more – and we need to step up for them
 Online abuse against women is rife, but some women suffer more – and we need to step up for them
 The Twitter Revolution in The Gulf Countries

2006 establishments in Delhi
Publications established in 2006
SAGE Publishing academic journals
Media studies journals
Marketing journals
Creativity journals
Triannual journals
English-language journals